Alexis Kohler, full name Arnaud Alexis Michel Kohler, (born 16 November 1972, Strasbourg) is a French special adviser, senior official, and politician. Énarque, former director of cabinet of Pierre Moscovici then of Emmanuel Macron at the Ministry of Finance, he was appointed general secretary of the Élysée Palace on 14 May 2017.

Early life and education
Born in 1972 in Strasbourg, Alexis Kohler is the son of Charles Kohler, a senior European official, and Sola Hakim, a lawyer. He grew up in Strasbourg. 

Kohler's education was quite classical: Sciences Po, ESSEC class 1993, ENA (class Averroès (1998-2000), like Fleur Pellerin, Nicolas Kazadi and Audrey Azoulay.

Career

Career in the public sector
Kohler began his career at the Direction générale du Trésor of the French Ministry for the Economy and Finance, then he was detached to various organisms, including the International Monetary Fund, then the Agence des participations de l'État. 

Following François Hollande's election, he became deputy director of Pierre Moscovici's cabinet, Minister of the Economy and Finance. In August 2014, he became the director of Emmanuel Macron's cabinet at Bercy (where the Ministry of finance is located).

Career in the private sector
When Emmanuel Macron resigned in 2016 to establish En marche !, Kohler returned to a position in the private sector as chief financial officer of MSC Cruises, the world's second largest ocean freight company. At the request of his employer, he settled in Grenoble, then Geneva, but continued to work remotely for Emmanuel Macron, by mails and WhatsApp loops. When the 2017 présidential campaign started, he was a central figure in the headquarters of En marche !

Secretary General, 2017–present
Kohler was appointed general secretary of the Élysée on 14 May 2017 and prepared the passage of relay with the outgoing general secretary, Jean-Pierre Jouyet. He is close to Édouard Philippe, whom Emmanuel Macron didn't know much when he appointed him Prime Minister.

In 2022, anti-graft group Anticor filed a complaint accusing Kohler of breaking conflict-of-interest rules after it emerged he had family links to the Italian owners of MSC Cruises. He was subsequently indicted by the national financial crimes prosecutor PNF.

Personal life
On 22 November 2003 Kohler married Sylvie Schirm with whom he had three children.

References

External links
 Alexis Kohler, le jumeau de l'ombre du président Macron on L'Express (15 July 2017)
 Alexis Kohler, l'intransigeant de l'Élysée on Le Figaro (30 July 2017)
 Alexis Kohler secrétaire général de l'Elysée on Boursier.com
 Alexis Kohler, le plus proche collaborateur on Les Échos (14 May 2017)
 Macron a déjà choisi son bras droit pour l'Élysée on l'Alsace.fr (7 May 2017)
 Passation de pouvoir : qui est Alexis Kohler? on Marianne (14 May 2017)

1972 births
Living people
Politicians from Strasbourg
La République En Marche! politicians
French people of German descent
ESSEC Business School alumni
Sciences Po alumni
École nationale d'administration alumni